Race of Stars is a karting race with celebrities on a street circuit located in the Historic Center of the city of Cartagena de Indias, Colombia. The race is organised by the Formula Smiles Foundation as a fundraising event. Drivers of worldwide racing series as Formula One, CART, IRL and Formula 3000 take part in the race.

Races
The first race was held in 2003 and was won by Ricardo Sperafico.
The 2005 race was won by Pedro de la Rosa.

RCN Network race
A special race "Colombian Race of Stars Nuestra Tele" was held together with RCN TV featuring well-known Colombian actors and TV hosts.

External links
Official site

Kart racing events
Sports competitions in Colombia